Rodrigo Henrique Santos de Souza (born 5 June 2003), commonly known as Rodriguinho, is a Brazilian professional footballer who plays as a midfielder for América Mineiro.

Career
Born in Contagem, Minas Gerais, Rodriguinho was an América Mineiro youth graduate. He was promoted to the first team in December 2021, and made his senior debut on 25 January 2022, starting in a 1–2 Campeonato Mineiro away loss against Caldense.

Career statistics

References

2003 births
Living people
People from Contagem
Brazilian footballers
Association football midfielders
Campeonato Brasileiro Série A players
América Futebol Clube (MG) players
Sportspeople from Minas Gerais